{{DISPLAYTITLE:Psi2 Draconis}}

Psi2 Draconis is a solitary giant star in the northern circumpolar constellation of Draco, also designated 34 Draconis. It lies just over a degree east of the brighter Psi1 Draconis. Psi2 Draconis has a yellow-white hue and is dimly visible to the naked eye with an apparent visual magnitude of 5.45.

According to R. O. Gray and associates (2001), the stellar classification of Psi2 Draconis is F2III+; a star that has used up its core hydrogen, cooled, and expanded away from the main sequence. A. P. Cowley and W. P. Bidelman (1979) found a similar class of F3 II-III, with the comment that the spectrum showed "many weak lines". Based on the abundance of iron, the metallicity of this star is much lower than in the Sun. It is about 800 million years old and is spinning with a projected rotational velocity of 50 km/s. The star has double the mass of the Sun but has expanded to 15 times the Sun's radius. It is radiating 448 times the luminosity of the Sun from its enlarged photosphere at an effective temperature of 6,925 K.

References

F-type giants
Draco (constellation)
Draconis, Psi2
Durchmusterung objects
Draconis, 34
164613
087728
6725